What Is to Be Done?, sometimes translated as What Then Must We Do? (Russian: Так что же нам делать?), is a non-fiction work by Leo Tolstoy in which he describes the social conditions of Russia in his day.

Tolstoy completed the book in 1886 and the first English language publication came in 1887 as What to Do?. A revised translation with the current title was published in 1899.

The English title was also used for two better-known works by Nikolai Chernyshevsky and Vladimir Lenin. Tolstoy's Russian title is similar, but not identical to Chernyshevsky's and Lenin's (Что делать?), both of them sharing the same Biblical reference (Luke 3:10–14).

External links 
 What Is To Be Done?, at TheAnarchistLibrary.org.
 What Shall We Do?, at Revoltlib.com.
 What Shall We Do? at Marxists.org
 What Then Must We Do? at Archive.org, OCR transcription needs work.
 What to Do?, 1887 English translation available on Google Books.
 What Is to Be Done?, 1899 English translation available on Google Books.
 What Then Must We Do?. Complete English translation.

1886 non-fiction books
Books by Leo Tolstoy
Works about Russia